Robert R. Neall (born June 26, 1948) is an American politician and Republican in Maryland who has served as state health secretary, state senator, state delegate and county executive of Anne Arundel County.

Elected offices 
Originally a Democrat, Neall switched parties in 1972 to become a Republican.  Neall was a member of the Maryland House of Delegates from 1975 to 1987, serving as the Minority Whip, 1978–83 and the Minority Leader, 1983-87. He was the Republican nominee for the United States Congress in the 4th District in 1986, losing to Tom McMillen in an extremely close election by 428 votes. He was elected County Executive of Anne Arundel County, Maryland from 1990 to 1994.

After his term ended, Neall was appointed by the Anne Arundel County Republican Central Committee to fill a vacancy as state senator from the 33rd District after the death of John A. Cade. Neall was a member of the Budget and Taxation Committee.  Neall was also a member of the Thornton Commission, which developed a plan for distributing money to the state's needier school districts in Baltimore City and Prince George's County and, after legislative compromise, Montgomery County.

In 1999, although the 33rd legislative District is one of Maryland's most conservative with 6,700 more registered Republicans than Democrats, Neall switched parties on ideological grounds and became a Democrat. In a letter to Richard D. Bennett, the state GOP chairman and now U.S. District Court Judge, Neall said, "While I have from time to time felt uncomfortable and unwelcome in the  Republican Party, (my) feelings have clearly worsened in recent years" because  of the changing nature of the party.

In 2002, Neall was soundly defeated for re-election by Republican Janet Greenip.  Afterward, Neall said of his party switch, "I have never ever regretted doing what I thought was right."

Ehrlich advisor 
In 2003, Baltimore City schools' chief executive, Bonnie S. Copeland requested that Neall help solve a severe budget deficit.  In order to qualify for a $42 million loan from the state, Gov. Bob Ehrlich requested that Neall draft a plan for fiscal and management accountability.  Neall's financial rescue plan was rejected by the Baltimore City School Board, sending the system into crisis as it headed towards insolvency. Neall then created controversy with his abrupt resignation on the day that he delivered his report.

Hogan advisor 
Neall rejoined the Republican party in 2014. In November 2014, then Governor-elect Larry Hogan appointed Neall to his transition team as a special adviser on fiscal policy. Neall was appointed to the University System of Maryland's Board of Regents effective July 1, 2015. He replaced Tom McMillen who defeated Neall for Congress in 1986. In May 2016, Governor Hogan appointed Neall as a senior administration adviser to head an effort to reorganize state government to run more efficiently. On December 21, 2017, Governor Hogan appointed Neall as Secretary of the Maryland Department of Health effective January 9, 2018. In November 2020 he announced his retirement, effective December 1, saying, "These last three years, though trying, have been very rewarding and I simply do not have the strength and vitality to continue. You have to know when to say when."

References

External links
 

1948 births
Living people
State cabinet secretaries of Maryland
Members of the Maryland House of Delegates
Maryland state senators
Anne Arundel County Executives
Maryland Republicans
Maryland Democrats
Anne Arundel Community College people
University of Maryland, College Park alumni
University of Baltimore School of Law alumni